Alain David (born 2 June 1949) is a French politician representing the Socialist Party. He was elected to the French National Assembly on 18 June 2017, representing the department of Gironde.

See also
 2017 French legislative election
 List of deputies of the 15th National Assembly of France

References

1949 births
Living people
People from Libourne
Deputies of the 15th National Assembly of the French Fifth Republic
Socialist Party (France) politicians
Politicians from Nouvelle-Aquitaine
Deputies of the 16th National Assembly of the French Fifth Republic